Chetan Karki (7 November 1938 – 16 May 2021) was a Nepali songwriter and film director. According to Prakash Sayami, Karki was the first screenwriter of Nepali cinema, having written his first screenplay for Pariwartan. He went on to write stories for more than a hundred Nepali films. He directed Bishwas, Pahilo Prem and Bhumari. He wrote songs for the films Maya Priti, Kanchi and Kanyadan, among others. "Teejako Rahara Aayo Barilai" is considered his most popular song.
 
As a writer, Karki published a poem, a collection of songs, a story and a novel. He also published poetry collections in Hindi and Urdu languages.

Karki died on 16 May 2021, from COVID-19 at the age of 83.

References

1938 births
2021 deaths
Nepalese writers
Nepalese filmmakers
Nepalese songwriters
Deaths from the COVID-19 pandemic in Nepal
People from Syangja District